Hoseynabad-e Olya (also Romanized as Ḩoseynābād-e ‘Olyā; also known as Ḩoseynābād) is a village in Dasht-e Rum Rural District, in the Central District of Boyer-Ahmad County, Kohgiluyeh and Boyer-Ahmad Province, Iran. At the 2006 census, its population was 782, in 163 families.

References 

Populated places in Boyer-Ahmad County